If Then Else (stylized if_then_else) is the sixth studio album by the Dutch rock band The Gathering. The album was released on 25 July 2000 through Century Media.

Background 
The album was recorded at the Koeienverhuurbedrijf Studio, Purmerend, and at S&K Studio, Doetinchem between January and March 2000, under the band's own guidance with Zlaya Hadzich as co-producer. The album was engineered by Zlaya Hadzich and Dick Kemper, mixed and mastered on Pro Tools by Attie Bauw at Bauwhaus Studio, Amsterdam, in April 2000.

Its title combines two frequently used computer programming notations:
 The if, then, else conditional statement
 The use of all lowercase, underscore-separated words

"Colorado Incident" is about a real-life experience of having to cancel a gig in Colorado because of overbooking, exhaustion and the band members' illnesses. Fans were frustrated, and the band was later very apologetic about this "incident". (It is apparently not about the 1999 Columbine High School massacre, as often speculated.)

An excerpt of Lewis Carroll's Alice in Wonderland, narrated by Willie Rushton, is heard between "Analog Park" and "Herbal Movement".

Track listing

Additional musicians 
Bart van Vegchel – French horn on tracks 1, 6, 11
Ad Verspaandonk – Trombon on tracks 6, 11
Emmeke Bressers – Oboe on track 6
Jasper Slotboom – cello on track 6
Marthe Kalkhoven – cello on track 6
Jiska ter Bals – violin on tracks 3, 6, 9, 10, 11

Charts

References 

The Gathering (band) albums
Century Media Records albums
2000 albums